Curtis R. Perry (born September 13, 1948) is an American former professional basketball player. Born in Washington, D.C., he attended Southwest Missouri State University (now known as Missouri State) and played at forward.

At Missouri State, Perry helped the team to a school record 28 consecutive wins.

Perry was selected by the San Diego Rockets in the third round of the 1970 NBA draft and by the Virginia Squires in the 1970 American Basketball Association Draft.

Perry played for the NBA's San Diego / Houston Rockets (1970–71), Milwaukee Bucks (1971–74) and Phoenix Suns (1974–78).

In his rookie season with San Diego in 1970–71, he was sent to the Northwest Travellers of the Continental Basketball Association in January 1971 and returned to the Rockets in March.  He helped the Bucks win the 1971–72 and 1972–73 NBA Midwest Division titles, and the 1973–74 NBA Western Conference championship. He also helped the Phoenix Suns win the 1975–76 NBA Western Conference championship. On February 15, 1975, Perry scored 26 points and grabbed a career-high 22 rebounds in a 111-107 loss against the Atlanta Hawks. In the 1976 Finals, Perry was a key player in "the greatest game ever played" in NBA history.

In 8 NBA seasons, Perry played in 480 games and had 13,656 minutes played, a .455 field goal percentage (1,904 for 4,188), .699 free throw percentage (770 for 1,101), 4,239 rebounds, 906 assists, 1,670 personal fouls and 4,578 points.  He averaged 9.5 points, 8.8 rebounds and 1.9 assists per game.

He was inducted into the Missouri State athletic Hall of Fame in 1980.

NBA career statistics

Regular season

|-
| align="left" | 1970–71
| align="left" | San Diego
| 18 || - || 5.6 || .438 || - || .550 || 1.7 || 0.3 || - || - || 2.9
|-
| align="left" | 1971–72
| align="left" | Houston
| 25 || - || 14.2 || .330 || - || .500 || 4.9 || 0.9 || - || - || 3.5
|-
| align="left" | 1971–72
| align="left" | Milwaukee
| 50 || - || 29.4 || .385 || - || .674 || 9.4 || 1.6 || - || - || 7.0
|-
| align="left" | 1972–73
| align="left" | Milwaukee
| 67 || - || 31.3 || .461 || - || .659 || 9.6 || 1.8 || - || - || 9.1
|-
| align="left" | 1973–74
| align="left" | Milwaukee
| 81 || - || 29.5 || .446 || - || .582 || 8.7 || 2.3 || 1.3 || 1.2 || 9.0
|-
| align="left" | 1974–75
| align="left" | Phoenix
| 79 || - || 34.0 || .477 || - || .719 || 11.9 || 2.4 || 1.4 || 1.0 || 13.4
|-
| align="left" | 1975–76
| align="left" | Phoenix
| 71 || - || 33.1 || .497 || - || .732 || 9.6 || 2.6 || 1.2 || 0.9 || 13.3
|-
| align="left" | 1976–77
| align="left" | Phoenix
| 44 || - || 31.6 || .432 || - || .789 || 9.0 || 1.8 || 1.1 || 0.6 || 10.7
|-
| align="left" | 1977–78
| align="left" | Phoenix
| 45 || - || 18.2 || .453 || - || .785 || 5.6 || 1.1 || 0.8 || 0.5 || 6.0
|- class="sortbottom"
| style="text-align:center;" colspan="2"| Career
| 480 || - || 28.5 || .455 || - || .699 || 8.8 || 1.9 || 1.2 || 0.9 || 9.5
|}

Playoffs

|-
| align="left" | 1971–72
| align="left" | Milwaukee
| 11 || - || 36.1 || .473 || - || .783 || 12.8 || 1.3 || - || - || 9.5
|-
| align="left" | 1972–73
| align="left" | Milwaukee
| 6 || - || 39.7 || .481 || - || .500 || 11.5 || 2.2 || - || - || 8.8
|-
| align="left" | 1973–74
| align="left" | Milwaukee
| 16 || - || 18.5 || .500 || - || .583 || 5.1 || 0.8 || 0.6 || 0.1 || 6.2
|-
| align="left" | 1975–76
| align="left" | Phoenix
| style="background:#cfecec;" | 19* || - || 32.4 || .454 || - || .647 || 7.7 || 1.9 || 0.6 || 0.9 || 12.7
|- class="sortbottom"
| style="text-align:center;" colspan="2"| Career
| 52 || - || 29.7 || .470 || - || .661 || 8.4 || 1.4 || 0.6 || 0.5 || 9.6
|}

Personal life
Perry is the father of former NBA player Byron Houston and has a daughter named Leslie Hardin. (1970).

References

External links

1948 births
Living people
African-American basketball players
American men's basketball players
Basketball players from Washington, D.C.
Houston Rockets players
Milwaukee Bucks players
Missouri State Bears basketball players
New Orleans Jazz expansion draft picks
Phoenix Suns players
Power forwards (basketball)
San Diego Rockets draft picks
San Diego Rockets players
Virginia Squires draft picks
21st-century African-American people
20th-century African-American sportspeople